Rhamphina may refer to:

Rhamphina (fly), a genus of insects in the family Tachinidae
Rhamphina (weevil), a subtribe of beetles in the tribe Rhamphini of the family Curculionidae